{{Infobox given name
| name                 = Tomislav
| pronunciation        = 
| gender               = masculine
| meaning              = Old Slavonic: томить/томити (to "languish", "torture", "struggle", "pine" or "yearn") + слава ("glory", "celebration")
| region               = 
| language             = 
| origin               = Slavic
| alternative spelling = 
| nickname             = Toma| variant forms        = Toma, Tomo, Tome, Tomče, Tomica, Tom, Tomi, Tomaš
| related names        = female form Tomislava, Tomisław, Tomiszláv
| name day             = Thomas the Apostle
| derived              = 
| footnotes            = 
| wikt                 = 
}}
Tomislav is a masculine given name of Slavic origin, that is widespread amongst the South Slavs.

The meaning of the name Tomislav is thought to have derived from the Old Slavonic verb "tomiti" or "tomit'" meaning to "languish", "torture" or "struggle", combined with "slava" meaning glory. Other origin theories suggest the name is a variant derived from the New Testament Apostle Thomas, whilst another theory postulates that it is a Slavicised corruption of the (Dog) Latin "Dominus Slavus".

The first recorded bearer of the name was the 10th-century King Tomislav of Croatia, for this reason it has become popular amongst Croats. In Croatia, the name Tomislav was among the top ten most common masculine given name in the decades between 1970 and 1999. The name is also widespread amongst Serbs, reaching popularity during the 1930s and 40s. King Alexander I of Yugoslavia gave his second child the name as a symbolic gesture of unity for his subjects. The name is also carried within the nations of Slovenia, Bosnia and Herzegovina, Montenegro, North Macedonia, and Bulgaria.

Amongst West Slavs, the cognate is Tomisław, and among Hungarians it is Tomiszláv.

Tomislav can also be found with alternative spelling in Poland, the Czech Republic, Slovakia and Hungary. Toma is a popular diminutive for Tomislav in the Balkans, whilst the derivative Name day (Tomindan'') is celebrated on October 6 according to the Julian calendar, and October 19 in the Gregorian calendar.

People with the name

Arts and entertainment
Tomislav Dretar, Croatian novelist
Tomislav Ivčić, Croatian singer
Tomislav Ladan, Croatian novelist
Tomislav Miličević, American musician
Tomislav Mužek, Croatian tenor
Tomislav Osmanli, Macedonian screenwriter
Tomislav "Toma" Zdravković, Serbian singer
Tomislav Zografski, Macedonian composer

Business
Tomislav Damnjanovic, Serbian businessman & arms smuggler
Tomislav Momirović, Serbian businessman and politician
Tomislav Karadžić, Montenegrin-Serb businessman & football administrator

Media
Tomislav Jakić, Croatian journalist 
Tomislav Kezarovski, Macedonian journalist

Military
Tomislav Sertić, Croatian General
Tomislav Simović, Serbian Lieutenant General (JNA)

Politics
Tomislav Donchev, Bulgarian politician
Tomislav Karamarko, Croatian politician
Tomislav Lampel, birth name of the Serbian-Israeli politician Yosef "Tommy" Lapid
Tomislav Ljubenović, Serbian politician
Tomislav Merčep, Croatian politician
Tomislav Nikolić, former President of Serbia
Tomislav Petrak, Croatian politician
Tomislav Žigmanov, Croat-Serbian politician

Royalty 
Tomislav of Croatia
Prince Tomislav of Yugoslavia
Tomislav II (honorary title), Prince Aimone, 4th Duke of Aosta

Science and academia
Tomislav Maretić, Croatian linguist & lexicographer
Tomislav Šola, Croatian museologist
Tomislav Trifić, Serbian academic & graphic artist
Tomislav Volek, Czech musicologist

Sports 
Tomislav Ašković, Serbian long-distance runner
Tomislav Brkić, Bosnian tennis player
Tomislav Butina, Croatian footballer
Tomislav Ćiraković, Montenegrin footballer
Tomislav Colić, Serbian footballer 
Tomislav Crnković, Croatian footballer
Tomislav Dokić, Serbian volleyball player
Tomislav Draganja, Croatian tennis player
Tomislav Ivić, Croatian football manager
Tomislav Ivković, Croatian footballer
Tomislav Jagurinovski, Macedonian handball player
Tomislav Jotovski, Macedonian tennis player
Tomislav Jurić, Croatian footballer
Tomislav Kaloperović, Serbian footballer & manager
Tomislav Karlo, Croatian swimmer
Tomislav Kelava, Serbian boxer
Tomislav Knez, Bosnian footballer
Tomi Kostadinov, Bulgarian footballer 
Tomislav Marić, Croatian footballer
Tomislav Mikulić, Croatian footballer
Tomislav Milićević, Serbian footballer  
Tomislav Mišura, Slovenian footballer
Tomislav Mrčela, Australian footballer
Tomislav Papazov, Bulgarian footballer 
Tomislav Pavlov, Bulgarian footballer
Tomislav Pajović, Serbian footballer 
Tomislav Pondeljak, Australian footballer
Tomislav Prosen, Croatian footballer
Tomislav Pucar, Croatian table tennis player
Tomislav Sivić, Serbian footballer 
Tomislav Smoljanović, Croatian rower
Tomislav Šokota, Croatian footballer
Tomislav Ternar, Slovenian tennis player
Tomislav Tomić, Bosnian footballer
Tomislav Višević, Bosnian-Croat footballer

Geographical place names
Tomislavci, Serbia
Tomislavgrad, Bosnia and Herzegovina 
Tomislavovac, Croatia

See also
 Tomisław (disambiguation)
 Slavic names

References

Masculine given names
Slavic masculine given names
Bosnian masculine given names
Croatian masculine given names
Serbian masculine given names
Bulgarian masculine given names

hr:Tomislav (razdvojba)